St. George's Episcopal Church is a church in Fredericksburg, Virginia at 905 Princess Anne Street.  The church, built in the 18th century and re-built in 1815 and 1849, is a part of the Episcopal Diocese of Virginia.  The building was listed on the National Register of Historic Places in 2019.

History 
An area of land was designated as "St. George's Parish" as early as 1720, but construction of a church building was not begun until 1732.  The wooden frame church was completed in 1741. Mary Ball Washington, the mother of George Washington, and her family living in the area, attended this old St. George's.

St. George's joined the new Protestant Episcopal Church of the United States in 1789.

A new building, in brick, replaced the old wooden church in 1815, but that was itself replaced by the present building in 1849.

During the Battle of Fredericksburg (1862), the church was damaged by cannon fire; it was also used as a command post for the Union Army when they took the city.

The church has been continuously developed, including the addition of side galleries (1854), the town clock and installation of striking stained glass windows (some by Tiffany) at various times (1885–1943). The original pews are still in use, but there have been various refurbishments and restorations to the organ (By Parsons Pipe Organ Builders), the buildings on the surrounding site such as the hall, and to the church building itself.

St. George's today 
The church is an active and thriving community, with a wide range of services, activities and events. Visitors are welcome, and the church is open for prayer and meditation daily from 8 am to 10 pm. On Sunday, the building remains open until approximately 9 pm. Sunday services are at 7:45 am, 9 am, and 11:15 am.  A Celtic service is held at 5:30 pm each Sunday and Compline is at 8 pm. During summer, services are at 7:45 am and 10 am.

The Rector is the Reverend Joe Hensley, who came from St. Luke's Episcopal Church in Durham, N.C. in early 2015.

See also
 Saint George: Devotions, traditions and prayers
 National Register of Historic Places listings in Fredericksburg, Virginia

References

External links
Official website

Episcopal churches in Virginia
Churches in Fredericksburg, Virginia
19th-century Episcopal church buildings
National Register of Historic Places in Fredericksburg, Virginia